The Arden-Ohman Orchestra was an American orchestra headed by bandleaders Victor Arden and Phil Ohman in the 1920s and 1930s. They recorded several hits including "I Love a Parade" and served as the pit band in Broadway shows such as Lady, Be Good (1924), Tip-Toes (1926) and Spring Is Here (1929).

Notes 

Disbanded American orchestras
Musical groups established in the 1920s
Musical groups disestablished in the 1930s
Victor Records artists
Brunswick Records artists
1920s establishments in the United States
1930s disestablishments in the United States